Chungu Chipako (born 27 January 1971) is a Zambian middle-distance runner. He competed in the men's 1500 metres at the 2000 Summer Olympics.

References

1971 births
Living people
Athletes (track and field) at the 2000 Summer Olympics
Zambian male middle-distance runners
Olympic athletes of Zambia
Place of birth missing (living people)